Nganga is a Kikongo language term for herbalist or spiritual healer in many African societies and also in many societies of the African diaspora such as those in Haiti, Brazil, and Cuba.  It is derived from *-ganga in Proto-Bantu which means "medicine".
As this term is a multiple reflex of a Proto-Bantu root, there are slight variations on the term throughout the entire Bantu-speaking world.

In Africa
The owner and operator of an nkisi, who ministered its powers to others, was the nganga.

In the Kingdom of Kongo the term "nganga" was the name for a person who possessed the skill to communicate with the Other World, as well as divining the cause of illness, misfortune and social stress and preparing measures to address them, often by supernatural means but sometimes natural medicine as well.  They were also responsible for charging nkisi, or physical objects intended to be the receptacle for spiritual forces. When Kongo converted to Christianity in the late fifteenth century, the term nganga was used to translate Christian priest as well as traditional spiritual mediators.  In modern Kikongo Christian priests are often called "Nganga a Nzambi" or "priests of God."

In South Africa, the inyanga has a medicinal role, in contrast to the sangoma, who deals with divination and the ancestral spirits, however, the distinction has become blurred in some areas and many traditional healers tend to practice both arts. In Swahili, mganga refers to a qualified physician or traditional healer.

Shona N'anga/Zulu Nyanga
 
Among the Shona people of Zimbabwe, a n'anga is a traditional healer who uses a combination of herbs, medical/religious advice and spiritual guidance to heal people. In Zimbabwe, N'angas are recognized and registered under the ZINATHA (Zimbabwe National Traditional Healer's Association).

They are believed to have religious powers to tell fortunes, and to change, heal, bless or even kill people. Traditionally N’angas were people’s main source of help in all matters of life. They have existed for decades well before the British colonial era. Guerrilla leaders are said to have consulted with N’angas during the Rhodesian Bush War.

Even today, N'angas are consulted by the people for advice and healing of many illnesses. Sometimes N'angas refer their patients to western medical practitioners and hospitals in case of emergency or illness they cannot cure with the help of their healing spirit.

Kongo nganga
An English missionary describes how an nganga looks during his healing performance:

This wild appearance was intended to create a frightening effect, or kimbulua in the Kongo language. The nganga's costume was often modeled on his nkisi. The act of putting on the costume was itself part of the performance; all participants were marked with red and white stripes, called makila, for protection.

The "circles of white around the eyes" refer to mamoni lines (from the verb mona, to see). These lines purport to indicate the ability to see hidden sources of illness and evil.

Yombe nganga often wore white masks, whose color represented the spirit of a deceased person. White was also associated with justice, order, truth, invulnerability, and insight: all virtues associated with the nganga.

The nganga is instructed in the composition of the nkondi, perhaps in a dream, by a particular spirit. In one description of the banganga's process, the nganga then cuts down a tree for the wood that s/he will use to construct the nkondi. S/he then kills a chicken, which causes the death of a hunter who has been successful in killing game and whose captive soul subsequently animates the nkondi figure. Based on this process, Gell writes that the nkondi is a figure an index of cumulative agency, a "visible knot tying together an invisible skein of spatio-temporal relations" of which participants in the ritual are aware.

In the Americas
In Cuba, the term nganga refers to a certain creation made with an iron cauldron into which several items (such as bones and sticks) are placed. It also refers to the spirit of the dead that resides there. In Palo, it refers to an iron cauldron used to venerate the mpungo which can be used for magic and divination.

See also
Traditional African religions
Traditional healers of South Africa
Witch doctor

External links
Nganga Kiyangala Congo religion in Cuba
African Intellectual Heritage: A Book of Sources By Molefi K. Asante, Abu Shardow Abarry 
THE STORY OF ZOMBI IN HAITI
The African Religions of Brazil: Toward a Sociology of the Interpenetration  By Roger Bastide 
An Anthology of Kongo Religion

References

Religion in Africa
African shamanism
Supernatural healing
Afro-American religion
Traditional African medicine
Traditional healthcare occupations
Zimbabwean culture
Society of Zimbabwe
African witchcraft
Kingdom of Kongo